The 2021 Monaco Grand Prix (officially known as the Formula 1 Grand Prix de Monaco 2021) was a  Formula One motor race held on 23 May 2021 at the Circuit de Monaco, a street circuit that runs through the Principality of Monaco. It was the fifth round of the 2021 Formula One World Championship, the 78th time that the Monaco Grand Prix was held, and the first time it had been held since  after the  round was cancelled due to the COVID-19 pandemic. The 78 lap race was won by Max Verstappen of Red Bull Racing after polesitter Charles Leclerc of Ferrari failed to start the race with a driveshaft problem.

Background 
This race marked the 750th race start for the Williams team, and to celebrate the occasion, Williams placed the names of 100 Williams supporters on the halo of their car, the FW43B. McLaren also ran a special one-off Gulf Racing–inspired livery for the event, to celebrate their collaboration started in the 1960s.

Entrants 

The drivers and teams were the same as the season entry list with no additional stand-in drivers for the race.

Tyre choices 
Tyre supplier Pirelli brought the C3, C4 and C5 tyre compounds (designated hard, medium and soft respectively) for teams to use at the event.

Qualifying 
Charles Leclerc qualified on pole despite crashing in the final minutes of Q3, whilst Max Verstappen joined him on the front row having qualified second, Valtteri Bottas shared the second row with Carlos Sainz having qualified third and fourth respectively. Lando Norris had his best qualifying result of the season and qualified fifth. Championship leader Lewis Hamilton had his worst qualifying since the 2018 German Grand Prix, and qualified outside the top two for the first time in 2021, qualifying seventh. Mick Schumacher was not able to participate in qualifying due to a heavy crash in the final practice session.

Qualifying classification 

 Notes
  – Mick Schumacher did not take part in qualifying due to an accident that occurred during the third practice session. He was permitted to race at the stewards' discretion. He also received a five-place grid penalty for an unscheduled gearbox change. The penalty was nullified as he would start from last place regardless.

Race

Race report 
Ferrari inspected Charles Leclerc's car overnight after his crash in qualifying. The primary concern was Leclerc's gearbox, but it was cleared, and it was expected that Leclerc would start on pole. On race day, Leclerc brought the car out from the pits on the reconnaissance lap out to the grid, and a failure in the left driveshaft was detected. There was not enough time to repair the problem before the race, and thus Leclerc did not start in the race. Ferrari later discovered the issue was caused by a cracked left-rear driveshaft hub.

Due to Leclerc's failure to start the race, pole position on the grid was left empty, leaving Max Verstappen as the de facto polesitter, though he lined up in the second grid position. At the start of the race Valtteri Bottas got away slightly better than Verstappen, but the latter was able to cover off the former to take the lead into the first corner. Bottas later retired at his scheduled pitstop on lap 30, when his team was unable to remove his right front wheel due to a stripped wheel nut, promoting Carlos Sainz to second place and Lando Norris to third. 

Verstappen pitted for fresh tyres on lap 34. Sergio Pérez led most of lap 35 before being called into the pits at the end of the same lap, and this meant that Verstappen officially led all laps through the pit stops. Pérez used pit strategy to improve to fourth, which is where he finished the race. The podium was formed by the same drivers in those positions at the halfway point of the race: Verstappen in the lead, Sainz in second, and Norris in third. Pérez, in fourth, closed in on Norris but was unable to pass him before the race ended. Sebastian Vettel and Antonio Giovinazzi scored their first points of the season, finishing fifth for Aston Martin and 10th for Alfa Romeo, respectively. This was also Alfa Romeo's first point of the season. Lewis Hamilton, in seventh, used a late race tyre change to challenge for the race's fastest lap, earning one extra championship point.

Three former Monaco Grand Prix winners, Kimi Räikkönen, Daniel Ricciardo, and Fernando Alonso, all finished one lap down on race winner Verstappen and out of the points in 11th, 12th and 13th places respectively. Verstappen's and Pérez's high points haul, along with Bottas' retirement and Hamilton's seventh-place finish, was sufficient to propel Red Bull into the lead in the Constructors' Championship, and Verstappen into the lead in the Drivers' Championship. This was the first time since the 2018 British Grand Prix that Mercedes had not led either championship. It was also the first time Verstappen was the points leader in his Formula One career. The FIA said it was open to suggesting layout changes for the future to the improve the on track excitement at the venue, after the race provided just one on-track overtake.

Post-race
Mercedes team boss, Toto Wolff admitted they had suffered a disastrous weekend. McLaren admitted it had not expected to be competitive enough for a podium result. In the aftermath of Leclerc's qualifying crash, FIA race director Michael Masi stated the FIA was looking into the possibility of introducing a rule where drivers who cause red flags in qualifying have their lap times deleted, to avoid the possibility of drivers crashing intentionally to prevent other drivers improving, though Masi said he was convinced Leclerc's qualifying crash was a genuine driver error. Télé Monte Carlo's broadcast direction was criticised after cutting away from Vettel's duel with Pierre Gasly to a replay of Lance Stroll hitting a kerb. The video became an internet meme.

Race classification

 Notes
  – Includes one point for fastest lap.
  – Charles Leclerc did not start the race. His place on the grid was left vacant.

Championship standings after the race

Drivers' Championship standings

Constructors' Championship standings

 Note: Only the top five positions are included for both sets of standings.

See also 
 2021 Monte Carlo Formula 2 round

Notes

References

External links

Monaco Grand Prix
Monaco Grand Prix
Grand Prix
Monaco Grand Prix